Ernest Henry Clark Oliphant (14 August 1862 – 20 April 1936), commonly referred to as E. H. Oliphant or Professor Oliphant, was an Australian journalist, an authority on Elizabethan literature, a popular public speaker and occasional playwright.

Life
Oliphant was the son of Felix Edwin Oliphant (c. 1908 – 19 February 1888) and Mary Bullers Oliphant, née Frost (died 28 March 1894)
His father gave his occupation as "gentleman", and apart from involvement in a few causes associated with aid to immigrants, nothing has been found of his activities, and from the obituaries it would appear Oliphant was closer to his mother.
He was educated at Scotch College, Melbourne and the University of Melbourne, but did not graduate. He was employed 1884–1888 as a librarian assistant at the Melbourne Public Library, after which he left for Europe. In 1890 he published in London The Mesmerist: a novel and three papers on the works of Beaumont and Fletcher in Englische Studien, Leipzig between 1890 and 1892, later reprinted in pamphlet form.

Oliphant returned to Melbourne in 1893 and settled in Korumburra, Victoria, where he became editor and proprietor of the Korumburra Times and in 1895 party to a well-publicised slanging match with his opposite number at the Southern Mail in the same town.
In 1895 he published, anonymously, a volume of verse, Lyrics, Religious and Irreligious. His name appeared as publisher however, and he afterwards acknowledged to Percival Serle that he was its author.
The following year he was offered a position with the Bendigo Advertiser, as town's Argus mining correspondent.

In 1898 he joined the staff of Critchley Parker's Australian Mining Standard, helping produce the booklet Victoria, Its Mines and Minerals. In 1899 he left for Queenstown, Tasmania as editor of the Mount Lyell Standard, then returned to Melbourne in 1902. While in Tasmania he discovered a reef of high-quality asbestos at Lynchford/ 
He was Sydney editor of Parker's Australian Mining Standard from 1903 to 1906, when he left for London to take up editorship of Parker's Money Market Review. The 50th anniversary of that paper coincided with the centenary of Argentina's independence, so he celebrated both with a special issue, noting how that country was going through a boom period.
While in England he wrote a series of papers on "Shakespeare's Plays: an Examination" which appeared in the July 1908 and January and April 1909 issues of the Modern Language Review.

He returned to Melbourne, and from 1911 to 1918 was editor-in-chief of Parker's Mining Standard, shortly renamed Australian Statesman and Mining Standard.
In August 1914 he published Germany and Good Faith, a history of Prussia's royal family. It was a considerable work of scholarship which was praised by the Times Literary Supplement and enjoyed good sales.

He was a member of the Melbourne Shakespeare Society and its president from 1919 to 1921. In 1914 he gave the society's annual lecture, a plea for the fuller recognition of the other dramatists of the Elizabethan period. The text of the lecture was published as The Place of Shakespeare in Elizabethan Drama.
He was himself writing plays about this time, and two of them were produced at Melbourne by Gregan McMahon: The Taint in 1915, and The Superior Race in 1916, both well received, neither has been revived since nor published in book form.

Oliphant was a founding member of the Mermaid Play Society, whose first production, Beaumont and Fletcher's The Knight of the Burning Pestle was staged at the Church of England Girls' Grammar School hall on 2 October 1919, produced by Arthur Goodsall. Everyman followed on October 28, then The Winter's Tale, The Comedy of Errors and The Critic, all produced by Goodsall.   
In October 1920 Everyman was produced by Mrs F. L. Apperly, an MA from Dublin University and a longtime member of the Irish Players. Oliphant's contribution to the workings of the society has not been determined.

In 1925 he left for America, where he was appointed lecturer in Elizabethan drama at Stanford University, California, also acting as guest lecturer at other American colleges and universities.
In 1927 Yale University published his most important work, The Plays of Beaumont and Fletcher, his study on the relative contributions of the two dramatists. Two years later he brought out in New York Shakespeare and his Fellow Dramatists in two volumes. Oliphant was then associated with New York University.

He returned to Melbourne in 1932, and was appointed Sidney Myer lecturer in Elizabethan drama at Melbourne University, a post he held for the rest of his life.

He was a popular figure on radio, known for reading and discussing short story masterpieces on 3LO 1932–1936
 
He died at his home at South Yarra and his remains were cremated at Springvale after a private funeral.

Plays
The Taint – a man inherits the vices of his parents. Performed by the Repertory Theatre Company on 10 April 1915.
The Superior Race — Gregan McMahon called it "the best Australian play I ever saw . . . made Englishmen look so inferior to the Chinese that only a repertory company could afford to risk it".

Books
Germany and Good Faith: A Study of the History of the Prussian Royal Family (August 1914) 
The plays of Beaumont and Fletcher : an attempt to determine their respective shares and the shares of others (1927) Yale University Press, Oxford University Press
 This was in two large volumes and included 15 plays by Shakespeare and 30 by other dramatists, with introduction and notes on their authors.
 Effectively the same book in one volume, with the Shakespeare section omitted.

Personal
Oliphant married Catherine Lavinia McWhae (1866 – 12 May 1949), daughter of Peter McWhae, on 6 September 1887
Sydney Kathleen Oliphant (13 September 1888 – 23 February 1970) married Thomas
Edith Mervyn Oliphant ( – ) married Stanley Anketell Allen on 14 November 1917
Enid Karin Oliphant BA ( – ) married Douglas Ludlow Dowdell (1872–1960) on 1 December 1920.
They had homes "Windermere", Royal Parade, Parkville in 1917; "Marlow", Murphy Street, South Yarra in 1921; later "Logan House" at 390 Toorak Road, South Yarra, Victoria.

References

1862 births
1936 deaths
Academic staff of the University of Melbourne
Australian dramatists and playwrights
Australian non-fiction writers
Australian male novelists
Writers from Melbourne
Male non-fiction writers
Stanford University faculty